Meall Mor (747 m) is a mountain in the Grampian Mountains of Scotland. It lies in the Stirling region, on the northern side of Loch Katrine in the Trossachs.

A rough wedge-like peak, the nearest village is Balquhidder to the northeast.

References

Marilyns of Scotland
Grahams
Mountains and hills of Stirling (council area)
Mountains and hills of the Southern Highlands